FIAF may refer to:
 Fasting-Induced Adipose Factor or ANGPTL4, a protein
  or International Federation of Film Archives, a Paris-based association of film archivists
 Finnish Air Force
 Fleet Intelligence Adaptive Force, a U.S. military intelligence unit reporting to Navy Cyber Forces
 French Institute Alliance Française, a New York-based organization for the promotion of Francophone culture
 La Federación Interamericana de Filatelia, a philatelic organisation for North and South America